The 2014–15 Barako Bull Energy season was the 13th season of the franchise in the Philippine Basketball Association (PBA).

Key dates
August 24: The 2014 PBA Draft took place in Midtown Atrium, Robinson Place Manila.
October 18: Barako Bull Energy fired head coach Siot Tanquingcen. He was replaced by assistant coach Koy Banal

Draft picks

Roster
S

Philippine Cup

Eliminations

Standings

Game log

Playoffs

Bracket

Commissioner's Cup

Eliminations

Standings

Game log

Playoffs

Bracket

Transactions

Trades

Draft day

Philippine Cup

Commissioner's Cup

Recruited imports

References

Barako Bull Energy seasons
Barako Bull